Albert Leatham (9 August 1859 – 13 July 1948) was an English cricketer. He played for Gloucestershire and Cambridge University between 1883 and 1897.

References

1859 births
1948 deaths
English cricketers
Gloucestershire cricketers
Cambridge University cricketers
Cricketers from Wakefield
Marylebone Cricket Club cricketers
Gentlemen of England cricketers
Lord Hawke's XI cricketers
North v South cricketers
W. G. Grace's XI cricketers
English cricketers of 1864 to 1889
English cricketers of 1890 to 1918
A. J. Webbe's XI cricketers